Mostis - Ancient Greek: - Μόστις, reigned ~ 130 BC - ~ 90 BC. King of the Caeni ruled over territories in South East Thrace - Strandzha mountain in today Bulgaria and Turkey.

The king is best known from his coins - bronze and silver and from an epigraphy. He emerged on the political scene after the death of Ziselmius - after 135/133 BC or little later in 127 BC.

Mostis coinage include - bronze coins and rare tetradrachm. On avers there are bust of king on right. More interesting is reverse side of silver coins: Athena Nikephoros seated on throne, vertical inscriptions ΒΑΣΙΛΕΩΣ ΜΟΣΤΙΔΟΣ. King Mostis coins are specific by inscription of year below throne of Athena - ΕΤΟΥΣ ΙΓ / IΔ etc.  On coins from years 13/14 and 35/38 there are second inscription - ΕΠΙ ΣΑΔΑΛΟΥ.
    
In 2012 was found first coin hoard contained tetradrachms of Mostis. Hoard is discovered in regular archaeological research in village of Sinemorets, by Bulgarian archaeologist Ms Daniela Agre - NAIM - BAS.

Tetradrachms of Mostis can be seen in museums in London, Berlin, Paris. Coins from Sinemorets hoard are in Tsarevo museum.

References

Thracian kings
2nd-century BC rulers in Europe
1st-century BC rulers in Europe